Typhinellus insolitus is a species of sea snail, a marine gastropod mollusk in the family Muricidae, the murex snails or rock snails.

Description
The length of the shell attains 16.9 mm.

Distribution
This marine species occurs at the Loyalty Ridge, New Caledonia.

References

 Houart, R, Buge, B. & Zuccon, D. (2021). A taxonomic update of the Typhinae (Gastropoda: Muricidae) with a review of New Caledonia species and the description of new species from New Caledonia, the South China Sea and Western Australia. Journal of Conchology. 44(2): 103–147.

External links
 Houart, R. (1991). Description of thirteen new species of Muricidae (Gastropoda) from Australia and the New Caledonian region, with range extensions to South Africa. Journal of the Malacological Society of Australia. 12: 35-55

insolitus
Gastropods described in 1991